Larry Brooks may refer to:
 Larry Brooks (American football), (born 1950) American football defensive tackle
 Larry Brooks (journalist), (born c. 1949/1950) American sports journalist

See also
 Lawrence Brooks, (1912–1994) American singer and actor
 Lawrence Brooks (American veteran) (1909–2022), African-American veteran of the United States Army